Charles Stevens (May 26, 1893 – August 22, 1964) was an American actor. He appeared in nearly 200 films between 1915 and 1961. A close friend of actor Douglas Fairbanks, Stevens appeared in nearly all of Fairbanks' films.

Early years
Stevens was born in Solomonville, Arizona, and his father was a white Arizona sheriff named George Stevens and mother a Mexican woman named Eloisa Michelena. Stevens was not, as many bios claim, the grandson of Geronimo. That erroneous information could be attributed to Stevens himself, who claimed such kinship, and film studios that promoted the supposed lineage.

Career
Stevens began his career during the silent era, playing mostly Native Americans and Mexicans in Westerns. During the 1930s and 1940s, he had roles in the film serials Wild West Days and Overland Mail. In the 1950s, Stevens guest-starred on several television series, including The Adventures of Wild Bill Hickok, The Adventures of Kit Carson, Sky King, The Lone Ranger, Zorro, and The Adventures of Rin Tin Tin. In two of those appearances in The Adventures of Rin Tin Tin, in 1954 and 1958, he played Geronimo.

He made his last onscreen appearance in the film The Outsider (1961), starring Tony Curtis.

Death 
Stevens died on August 22, 1964, and is buried in Valhalla Memorial Park in North Hollywood in Los Angeles County, California.

Filmography

References

External links
 

1893 births
1964 deaths
Male actors from Arizona
American male film actors
American male silent film actors
American male television actors
Burials at Valhalla Memorial Park Cemetery
People from Graham County, Arizona
Male Western (genre) film actors
20th-century American male actors
Western (genre) television actors